is a passenger railway station located in the city of  Yokosuka, Kanagawa Prefecture, Japan, operated by the private railway company Keikyū.

Lines
Tsukuihama Station is served by the Keikyū Kurihama Line and is located 9.7 rail kilometers from the junction at Horinouchi Station, and 62.0 km from the starting point of the Keikyū Main Line at Shinagawa Station in Tokyo.

Station layout
The station consists of two opposed elevated side platforms serving two tracks, with the station building underneath.

Platforms

History
Tsukuihama Station opened on March 27, 1966, as the southern terminus of the Kurihama Line, until superseded by Miurakaigan Station on July 7 of the same year.

Keikyū introduced station numbering to its stations on 21 October 2010; Tsukuihama Station was assigned station number KK70.

Passenger statistics
In fiscal 2019, the station was used by an average of 6,299 passengers daily. 

The passenger figures for previous years are as shown below.

Surrounding area
 Kanagawa Prefectural Tsukuihama High School
Yokosuka City Tsukui Kindergarten
Yokosuka Tsukui Post Office
Tsukui Beach

See also
 List of railway stations in Japan

References

External links

 

Railway stations in Kanagawa Prefecture
Keikyū Kurihama Line
Railway stations in Japan opened in 1966
Railway stations in Yokosuka, Kanagawa